"The Three Bells", also known as "The Jimmy Brown Song", "Little Jimmy Brown", or simply "Jimmy Brown", is a song made popular by the Browns in 1959. The song is an English adaptation of the French language song "Les Trois Cloches" written by Jean Villard, with English lyrics by Bert Reisfeld. The single reached number one in the U.S. on Billboards Hot C&W Sides chart and the Billboard Hot 100 chart in 1959.

Origin
The song is an English adaptation of the French language song "Les Trois Cloches" written by Jean Villard (also known as Gilles). This French song narrates the life of someone named Jean-François Nicot who lived in a small village at the bottom  a valley, starting with his birth, then his marriage and ending with his death, events all accompanied by ringing of the bells.  The song was recorded a cappella by Edith Piaf with the French vocal group Les Compagnons de la chanson with an arrangement by group member Marc Herrand in July 1946.

Piaf and Les Compagnons introduced the song to an American audience in a tour in 1947. Two different English versions of "Les trois cloches"  were written in 1948 – "While the Angelus Was Ringing" (with unrelated lyrics and recorded by Frank Sinatra among others), and "The Three Bells". The English lyrics of "The Three Bells" was written by Bert Reisfeld based broadly on the French original, and the name of the person in the song  was changed from Jean-François Nicot to Jimmy Brown. The Melody Maids recorded the English version in 1948. In 1950, Piaf herself recorded the English version. In 1951, The Andrews Sisters also recorded the song. Their version  was the longest song the Andrews Sisters recorded for the label Decca Records, and although it was well-received by Billboard, the release failed to chart. Les Compagnons de la chanson themselves also recorded an English version of "The Three Bells". This version reached No. 14 in the United States in 1952, and No. 21 in the UK in 1959.

The Browns' recording
The most successful version of the song was recorded by country group the Browns in 1959. The Browns at that time were considering quitting the music business, and for what they intended to be their last recording, they chose "The Three Bells".  Bonnie Brown had first heard the song being played on a local radio station (a deejay had heard "Les Trois Cloches" by Les Compagnons in Europe, and brought the record back to the US and played the song on his shows, which brought attention to the English version), and contacted the deejay to get a copy of the song. As radio stations at that time rarely played songs longer than three minutes, the Browns shortened each of the three verses to keep their recording under three minutes.  

The Browns recorded the song at the RCA Studio B in Nashville on June 3, 1959. The song was produced by Chet Atkins with Anita Kerr helping with the arrangement of the song. Atkins was convinced the song would be "the biggest hit ever", and told the Browns: "I've just recorded you a million-seller. There's no way you'll be quitting the business". 

The song was released on July 3, 1959. It reached number one on [[Billboard Hot 100|Billboard Hot 100]], staying there for four weeks. It also topped the Hot C&W Sides chart for 10 weeks, as well as reaching number ten on Billboards Hot R&B Sides chart.

The song sold half a million copies within the first month of its debut on the chart, eventually selling over a million copies. The song received a Grammy nomination in 1959 for Best Record of the Year  but lost to "Mack the Knife".

Other versions
The song has also been covered by many other artists. Brian Poole & The Tremeloes's version reached No. 17 on the UK chart in 1965. Nana Mouskouri recorded a version in 1974 which reached No. 7 on the Dutch charts. The Irish singer Daniel O'Donnell recorded a  version which reached No. 19 on the Irish chart in 1991.

 Chart position 
Les Compagnons de la chanson

 The Browns 

Year-end charts

All-time charts

Jim Ed Brown

 Daniel O'Donnell 

See also
While the Angelus Was Ringing

References

External links
"Les trois cloches" from The Originals'' website

1959 singles
The Browns songs
Jim Ed Brown songs
Andy Williams songs
Gene Summers songs
Billboard Hot 100 number-one singles
Cashbox number-one singles
French songs
Song recordings produced by Chet Atkins
Year of song missing